WGCK-FM is a Contemporary Christian-formatted broadcast radio station licensed to Coeburn, Virginia, serving Dickenson and Wise counties in Virginia and Letcher County in Kentucky. WGCK-FM is owned and operated by Letcher County Broadcasting, Inc.

References

External links
 K-Love Online
 

1991 establishments in Virginia
Contemporary Christian radio stations in the United States
Radio stations established in 1991
K-Love radio stations
Wise County, Virginia
GCK-FM